Aliabad-e Jainag (also Romanized as ‘Alīābād-e Jāī'nag; also known as ‘Alīābād) is a village in Delvar Rural District, Delvar District, Tangestan County, Bushehr Province, Iran. At the 2006 census, its population was 641, in 151 families.

References 

Populated places in Tangestan County